The 2013 The Oaks Club Challenger is a professional tennis tournament played on outdoor clay courts. It is the fifth edition of the tournament which is part of the 2013 ITF Women's Circuit, offering a total of $50,000 in prize money. It takes place in Osprey, Florida, United States, on March 25–31, 2013.

WTA entrants

Seeds 

 1 Rankings are as of March 18, 2013

Other entrants 
The following players received wildcards into the singles main draw:
  Irina Falconi
  Olga Ianchuk
  Chalena Scholl
  Chiara Scholl

The following players received entry from the qualifying draw:
  Jennifer Brady
  Catalina Castaño
  Jill Craybas
  Mariana Duque Mariño

The following player received entry into the singles main draw as a Lucky Loser:
  Madison Brengle

The following player received entry by a Junior Exempt:
  Kateřina Siniaková

Champions

Singles 

  Mariana Duque Mariño def.  Estrella Cabeza Candela, 7–6(7–2), 6–1

Doubles 

  Raquel Kops-Jones /  Abigail Spears def.  Verónica Cepede Royg /  Inés Ferrer Suárez, 6–1, 6–3

External links 
 2013 The Oaks Club Challenger at ITFtennis.com
 

The Oaks Club Challenger
Clay court tennis tournaments
Tennis tournaments in the United States
Oaks Club Challenger, The
Oaks Club Challenger, The